Morton Valence are a London-based rock band based around the vocal pairing of songwriter, producer and multi-instrumentalist Robert 'Hacker' Jessett (ex-member of The Band of Holy Joy and Alabama 3) and Anne Gilpin. They term their music as Urban Country and were described by The Guardian as being "one of the most intriguing bands on these shores".

Founded in 2001 by Robert Jessett, Anne Gilpin and Chuck Whobrey, the band won the 2006 Fopp Award for best new band and went on to sign a record contract with Cheap Date Records. After the release of the single "Sailors" - described by the BBC as being "the best single you've never heard of the past decade" - they split from Cheap Date to form their own label, Bastard Recordings, and are an early example of an independent band who entered into a crowd funding agreement with their fans. Their 2009 single Chandelier was a BBC Radio 2 Record of the Week.

They have recorded eight full-length studio albums, all of which have been highly acclaimed in the music press, including four star reviews in Mojo Magazine Q MagazineUncut MagazineClassic Rock Magazine and an album of the year on the Chicago-based website Consequence of Sound.

In 2020 Jessett and Gilpin wrote and directed an autobiographical film documentary entitled This Is A Film About A Band that was premiered at the Doc'N Roll Film Festival in London.

Their eponymously titled eighth album was produced by legendary pedal steel guitar player BJ Cole, who also appears on the album and plays with the band intermittently.

Discography

Albums
Bob and Veronica's Big Move (2001) Whipwray
Bob and Veronica Ride Again (2009) Bastard Recordings
Me & Home James (2011) Bastard Recordings
Left (2014) Bastard Recordings 
Another Country (2015) Bastard Recordings
Europa (2017) Bastard Recordings
Bob & Veronica's Great Escape (2019) Bastard Recordings
Black Angel Drifter (2020) Cow Pie Ltd/Cargo Records (UK)
Morton Valence (2022) Cow Pie Ltd/Cargo Records (UK)

Singles
The Girl on The Escalator - as Florida - (2002) Monika Enterprise 
Sailors (2007) Cheap Date Records
Chandelier (2009) Bastard Recordings
Falling Down the Stairs (2009) Bastard Recordings
Hang it on the Wall (2010) Bastard Recordings
Christmas in Valence (2011) Bastard Recordings
Skyline Change/Genders Blur (2019) Bastard Recordings
Black-Eyed Susan (2020) Cow Pie Ltd/Cargo Records (UK)
Summertime in London (2022) Cow Pie Ltd/Cargo Records (UK)

References

External links
Official website mortonvalence.com

English indie rock groups
Musical groups from London